Computer science education  or computing education is the art of teaching and learning the discipline of computer science, and computational thinking. As a subdiscipline of pedagogy it also addresses the wider impact of computer science in society through its intersection with philosophy, psychology, linguistics, natural sciences, and mathematics. In comparison to  science education and mathematics education, computer science (CS) education is a much younger field. In the history of computing, digital computers were only built from around the 1940s – although computation has been around for centuries since the invention of analog computers.

Another differentiator of computer science education is that it has primarily only been taught at university level until recently, with some notable exceptions in Israel, Poland and the United Kingdom with the BBC Micro in the 1980s as part of Computer science education in the United Kingdom. Computer science has been a part of the school curricula from age 14 or age 16 in a few countries for a few decades, but has typically as an elective subject.

Primary and secondary computer science education is relatively new in the United States with many K-12 CS teachers facing obstacles to integrating CS instruction such as professional isolation, limited CS professional development resources, and low levels of CS teaching self-efficacy. According to a 2021 report, only 51% of high schools in the US offer computer science.
Elementary CS teachers in particular have lower CS teaching efficacy and have fewer chances to implement CS into their instruction than their middle and high school peers. Connecting CS teachers to resources and peers using methods such as Virtual Communities of Practice has been shown to help CS and STEM teachers improve their teaching self-efficacy and implement CS topics into student instruction.

Computing education research
Educational research on computing and teaching methods in computer science is usually known as Computing Education Research. The Association for Computing Machinery (ACM) runs a Special Interest Group (SIG) on Computer science education known as SIGCSE which celebrated its 50th anniversary in 2018, making it one of the oldest and longest running ACM Special Interest Groups.

SIGCSE sponsors the conference Innovation and Technology in Computer Science Education (ITiCSE).

An outcome of computing education research are Parsons problems.

Gender perspectives in computer science education 
In many countries, there is a significant gender gap in computer science education. In 2015, 15.3% of computer science students graduating from non-doctoral granting institutions in the US were women while at doctoral granting institutions, the figure was 16.6%. The number of female PhD recipients in the US was 19.3% in 2018. In almost everywhere in the world, less than 20% of the computer science graduates are female. This problem mainly arises due to the lack of interests of girls in computing starting from the primary level. Despite numerous efforts by programs specifically designed to increase the ratio of women in this field, no significant improvement has been observed. Furthermore, a declining trend has been noticed in the involvement of women in past decades. The main reason for the failure of these programs is because almost all of them focused on girls in high school or higher levels of education. Researchers argue that by then women have already made up their mind and stereotypes start to form about computer scientists. Computer Science is perceived as a male dominated field, pursued by people who are nerdy and lack social skills. All these characteristics seem to be more damaging for a woman as compared to a man. Therefore, in order to break these stereotypes and to engage more women in computer science, it is crucial that there are special outreach programs designed to develop interest in girls starting at the middle school level and prepare them for a academic track towards the hard sciences.

Evidently, there are a few countries in Asia and Africa where these stereotypes do not exist and women are encouraged for a career in science starting at the primary level, thus resulting in a gender gap that is virtually nonexistent. In 2011, women earned half of the computer science degrees in Malaysia. In 2001, 55 percent of computer science graduates in Guyana were women.

References

 
Education by subject